In music, galant refers to the style which was fashionable from the 1720s to the 1770s. This movement featured a return to simplicity and immediacy of appeal after the complexity of the late Baroque era.  This meant simpler, more song-like melodies, decreased use of polyphony, short, periodic phrases, a reduced harmonic vocabulary emphasizing tonic and dominant, and a clear distinction between soloist and accompaniment. C. P. E. Bach and Daniel Gottlob Türk, who were among the most significant theorists of the late 18th century, contrasted the galant with the "learned" or "strict" styles.) The German empfindsamer Stil,  which seeks to express personal emotions and sensitivity, can be seen either as a closely related North-German dialect of the international galant style, or as 
contrasted with it, as between the music of Carl Philipp Emanuel Bach, a founder of both styles, and that of Johann Christian Bach, who carried the galant style further and was closer to classical.

This musical style was part of the wider galant movement in art at the time.

The word "galant" derives from French, where it was in use from at least the 16th century. In the early 18th century, a galant homme described a person of fashion, who was elegant, cultured and virtuous. The German theorist Johann Mattheson appears to have been fond of the term. It features in the title of his first publication of 1713, Das neu-eröffnete Orchestre, oder Universelle und gründliche Anleitung wie ein Galant Homme einen vollkommenen Begriff von der Hoheit und Würde der edlen Music erlangen. (Instead of the Gothic type rendered here in italics, Mattheson used Roman to emphasize the many non-German expressions. Mattheson was apparently the first to refer to a "galant style" in music, in his Das forschende Orchestre of 1721. He recognized a lighter, modern  style, einem galanten Stylo and named among its leading practitioners Giovanni Bononcini, Antonio Caldara, Georg Philipp Telemann, Alessandro Scarlatti, Antonio Vivaldi and George Frideric Handel. All were composing Italian opera seria, a voice-driven musical style, and opera remained the central form of galant music. The new music was not as essentially a court music as it was a city music: the cities emphasized by Daniel Heartz, a recent historian of the style, were first of all Naples, then Venice, Dresden, Berlin, Stuttgart and Mannheim, and Paris. Many galant composers spent their careers in less central cities, ones that may be considered consumers rather than producers of the style galant: Johann Christian Bach and Carl Friedrich Abel in London, Baldassare Galuppi in Saint Petersburg and Georg Philipp Telemann in Hamburg.

Not every contemporary was delighted with this revolutionary simplification: Johann Samuel Petri, in his Anleitung zur praktischen Musik (1782) spoke of the "great catastrophe in music".

The change was as much at the birth of Romanticism as it was of Classicism. The folk-song element in poetry, like the singable cantabile melody in galant music, was brought to public notice in Thomas Percy's Reliques of Ancient Poetry (1765) and James Macpherson's "Ossian" inventions during the 1760s.

Some of Telemann's later music and of Bach's sons, Johann Joachim Quantz, Johann Gottlieb and Carl Heinrich Graun, Franz and Georg Anton Benda, Frederick the Great, Johann Adolph Hasse, Giovanni Battista Sammartini, Giuseppe Tartini, Baldassare Galuppi, Johann Stamitz, Domenico Alberti, and early Haydn and Mozart are exemplars of galant style. Some of the works of the Portuguese composer Carlos Seixas are firmly in the galant style.

This simplified style was melody-driven, not constructed on rhythmic or melodic motifs as so much classical music was to be: "It is indicative that Haydn, even in his old age, is reported to have said, 'If you want to know whether a melody is really beautiful, sing it without accompaniment' ". This simplification also extended to harmonic rhythm, which is generally slower in galant music than is the case in the earlier baroque style, thus making lavish melodic ornamentation and nuances of secondary harmonic colorings more important.

The affinities of galant style with Rococo in the visual arts are easily overplayed, but characteristics that were valued in both genres were freshness, accessibility and charm. Watteau's fêtes galantes were rococo not merely in subject matter, but also in the lighter, cleaner tonality of his palette, and the glazes that supplied a galant translucency to his finished pictures often compared to the orchestrations of galant music.

References

Sources

Further reading
 Gjerdingen, Robert O. 2007. Music in the Galant Style. Oxford and New York: Oxford University Press. .
 Grout, Donald Jay, and Claude V. Palisca. 1996. A History of Western Music, fifth edition. New York: W. W. Norton.

Baroque music
Classical period (music)
Age of Enlightenment